The Communauté urbaine d'Alençon is the communauté urbaine, an intercommunal structure, centred on the city of Alençon. It is located in the Orne and Sarthe departments, in the Normandy and Pays de la Loire regions, northwestern France. It was created in December 1996. Its area is 461.7 km2. Its population was 55,924 in 2018, of which 25,775 in Alençon proper.

Composition
The communauté urbaine consists of the following 31 communes, of which 5 (Arçonnay, Champfleur, Chenay, Saint Paterne - Le Chevain and Villeneuve-en-Perseigne) in the Sarthe department:

Alençon
Arçonnay
Cerisé
Champfleur
Chenay
Ciral
Colombiers
Condé-sur-Sarthe
Cuissai
Damigny
Écouves
La Ferrière-Bochard
Gandelain
Héloup
Lalacelle
Larré
Lonrai
Ménil-Erreux
Mieuxcé
L'Orée-d'Écouves
Pacé
La Roche-Mabile
Saint-Céneri-le-Gérei
Saint-Denis-sur-Sarthon
Saint-Ellier-les-Bois
Saint-Germain-du-Corbéis
Saint-Nicolas-des-Bois
Saint Paterne - Le Chevain
Semallé
Valframbert
Villeneuve-en-Perseigne

References

Alencon
Alencon
Alencon